This is the discography documenting albums and singles released by Takida.

Albums

1 First album released outside of Scandinavia

Singles

Notes

EPs and other releases
 Old (2000)
 T2 (2000)
 tAKiDA (2001)
 Gohei (2003)
 Thorns (2004)

Other appearances

Music videos

References

Discographies of Swedish artists
 
Rock music group discographies